Pat Swoopes (born March 4, 1964) is a former American football defensive tackle. He played for the New Orleans Saints in 1987 and 1989, the Hamilton Tiger-Cats in 1988 and for the Kansas City Chiefs and Miami Dolphins in 1991.

References

1964 births
Living people
American football defensive tackles
Mississippi State Bulldogs football players
New Orleans Saints players
Hamilton Tiger-Cats players
Kansas City Chiefs players
Miami Dolphins players